The Ujmajuridze is a Georgian family name from the Guria region in western Georgia.

The Ujmajuridze family name comes from these towns of Guria: Baileti, Bakhvi, Bokhvauri, Bukistsikhe, Goraberezho, Gogolesubani, Dvabzu, Erketi, Zomleti, Lanchkhuti, Nagomari, Natanebi, Ozurgeti, Partskhma, Chaisubani, Chokhatauri, Khevi and Khidistavi.

References 

Georgian-language surnames